Kemar Mowatt (born 12 March 1995) is a professional Jamaican hurdler.

Personal life
In 2018 he became a graduate of the University of Arkansas.

Career
He was a 2 time SEC champion, and a double time NCAA finalist, and a medalist at his national championship in Jamaica in 2017 and 2018. Without any previous merits at the international level, he finished fourth at the 2017 World Championships. He won the 2019 Jamaican 400m hurdles National Championships.

His personal best time is 48.49 seconds, achieved in June 2017 in Eugene, Oregon.

He qualified to represent Jamaica at the 2020 Summer Olympics where he reached the semi finals.

References 

1995 births
Living people
Jamaican male hurdlers
World Athletics Championships athletes for Jamaica
Arkansas Razorbacks men's track and field athletes
Athletes (track and field) at the 2019 Pan American Games
Pan American Games bronze medalists for Jamaica
Pan American Games medalists in athletics (track and field)
Medalists at the 2019 Pan American Games
Athletes (track and field) at the 2020 Summer Olympics
Olympic athletes of Jamaica
20th-century Jamaican people
21st-century Jamaican people